Professor Robert Harvey Cassen OBE (born 1935), is a British economist and former Professor of the Economics of Development at the University of Oxford.

Biography

Robert Cassen was born on 24 March 1935 and educated at Bedford School, at New College, Oxford, at the University of California, Berkeley, and at Harvard University, where he completed his doctorate in economics. He taught in the department of economics at the London School of Economics between 1961 and 1969, was Senior Economist at the Overseas Development Ministry between 1966 and 1967, Senior Economist at the World Bank between 1969 and 1972 (and again between 1980 and 1981), Special Advisor to the House of Commons Select Committee on Overseas Development between 1973 and 1974, Director of the Oxford Department of International Development between 1986 and 1993, Professor of the Economics of Development at the University of Oxford between 1986 and 1997, and Professorial Fellow at St Antony's College, Oxford between 1986 and 1997. He has been visiting professor at the London School of Economics since 1997.

He was appointed OBE in the 2008 New Year Honours.

Publications

India: Population, Economy, Society, 1978
Planning for Growing Populations, 1979
World Development Report, 1981
Rich Country Interests and Third World Development, 1982
Soviet Interests in the Third World, 1985
Does Aid Work?, 1986, 2nd edition 1994
Poverty in India, 1992
Population and Development: Old Debates, New Conclusions, 1994
India: The Future of Economic Reform, 1995
21st Century India: Population, Economy, Human Development and the Environment, 2004
Tackling Low Educational Achievement, 2007

References

1935 births
People educated at Bedford School
Alumni of New College, Oxford
English economists
Fellows of St Antony's College, Oxford
Living people
Harvard Graduate School of Arts and Sciences alumni
Officers of the Order of the British Empire
Academics of the London School of Economics
University of California, Berkeley alumni